The following records were set in various events at the 2016 Summer Paralympics in Rio de Janeiro. The records listed include those broken in a later round of the event.

Paralympic and world records set by sport

Athletics

Cycling (track)

Powerlifting

Rowing

Shooting

Swimming

See also
World and Olympic records set at the 2016 Summer Olympics

Notes

References
Rio 2016 - Paralympics records page 

2016 Summer Paralympics
Paralympic records